The 1970 Central Michigan Chippewas football team represented Central Michigan University as an independent during the 1970 NCAA College Division football season. In their fourth season under head coach Roy Kramer, the Chippewas compiled a 7–3 record and outscored their opponents, 263 to 190. The team's statistical leaders included quarterback Mick Brzezinski with 775 passing yards, tailback Jesse Lakes with 1,296 rushing yards, and Rick Groth with 451 receiving yards. Lakes received the team's most valuable player award for the first of two consecutive years.

Schedule

References

Central Michigan
Central Michigan Chippewas football seasons
Central Michigan Chippewas football